Acronychia pubescens, commonly known as hairy acronychia or hairy aspen, is a species of tall shrub or small tree that is endemic to eastern Australia. It usually has trifoliate leaves, rarely simple leaves, groups of whitish flowers in leaf axils and creamy to yellowish, elliptical to spherical fruit.

Description 
The trunk is mostly cylindrical, occasionally with flanges at the base. The bark is greyish brown and relatively smooth, the small branchlets golden with downy hair. The top surface of the leaflets is downy, particularly along the mid-rib, but the lower surface is hairier. The hairy leaves distinguish this species from other members of the genus.

Taxonomy
Hairy acronychia was first described in 1891 by Frederick Manson Bailey who gave it the name Melicope pubescens and published the description in the Botany Bulletin of the Department of Agriculture, Queensland from a collection from the Blackall Range. It gained its current binomial name in 1939 when reclassified by his grandson, Queensland Government Botanist Cyril Tenison White, in the Proceedings of the Royal Society of Queensland. The specific epithet pubescens means hairy, referring to the downy leaves.

Distribution and habitat
Acronychia pubescens ranges from Urunga in northern New South Wales to the Blackall Range in south eastern Queensland. The habitat is of several rainforest types, including subtropical rainforest on red/brown basaltic soils, littoral rainforest and riverine rainforest. It is most often seen in warm temperate rainforest at higher altitudes.

Use in horticulture
Removal of the flesh from the seed is advised for regeneration. Around a half of the seeds may germinate in seven months. Cuttings may also be attempted. Acronychia pubescens requires good drainage, but benefits from extra water and fertiliser when grown in cultivation. Although its fruits are edible, their turpentine taste detracts somewhat from their palatability.

References

Flora of New South Wales
Flora of Queensland
pubescens
Plants described in 1891
Taxa named by Frederick Manson Bailey